Abaluhya Football Club Leopards Sports Club, officially abbreviated as AFC Leopards, or simply known as AFC, Leopards or , is a Kenyan association football club based in Nairobi. It currently competes in the Kenyan Premier League, the top tier of the Kenyan football league system, and was founded in 1964 by football lovers from the luhya community. With 12 top-flight league titles to their name, AFC Leopards is Kenya's second most successful club behind Gor Mahia (18 titles), with whom they regularly contest the Mashemeji Derby. The team currently plays most of its home games at the Nyayo National Stadium

AFC Leopards' standing as one of the most successful clubs in the region is underlined by the fact that it has won the Kenyan Premier League a record 12 times. AFC Leopards has also won the Kenya Cup 10 times, and the CECAFA Club Championship 5 times.

The club was formed in 1964 as Abaluhya United Football Club. In 1973 the club changed the name to Abaluhya Football Club when a number of small clubs amalgamated. In 1980 the club was named AFC Leopards till now.

In 2008 they played in the Nationwide League and won the title in their zone. They returned to the Kenyan Premier League for the 2009 season in which it also won the KFF Cup.

History

The 1960s: The Good Beginnings
From the 1960s or even earlier; the notion and formation of various Abaluya teams for invitational matches became the forerunner of what eventually would become Abaluhya United. The East African Standard Newspapaer published a report on the birth of a club called Abaluhya Football Club which resulted from the amalgamation of Marama, Samia United and Bunyore; all Nairobi based clubs that were in Division 1 of the Kenya National Football League. The amalgamation process also included lower division clubs such as Kisa, Tiriki, Bukusu Brotherhood, Busamia, Lurambi, Butsotso, Bushibungo and Eshirotsa thus building its base and establishments that would make it a success in the future. This was reported in the newspaper on 12 March 1964, making it our official birthday.

The 1970s and 80s: Legacy Building and Golden Era
This was a period of the club’s sustained performance pushed the Club to more fame and  paved the way for a future glorious era. This included winning the Kenya National Football League in an unbeaten fashion and in the process becoming the first Kenyan club to do so.

Business as usual as Leopards marked the 80s by bring more silverware to the Den marking an unprecedented period of dominance majorly in the domestic and regional scene.

The 1990s and 2000s: Little Success and Decline
In the 90s, achievements became less frequent, although in general the team continued to win some championships thus never suffering a considerable title drought.

The beginning of dismal campaigns for the following 10 years, including relegation from the top tier. However, the club’s strong team spirit, the goals of its founders, its relatively stable support base; ensured the club is rejuvenated.

Honours

League Honours
Kenya National Football League/Kenyan Super League/Kenyan Premier League
 Champions (12): 1966, 1967, 1970, 1973, 1980, 1981, 1982, 1986, 1988, 1989, 1992, 1998
Kenyan Nationwide League
Champions (Promoted): 2008

Cup Honours
FKF President's Cup: 10
 Champions (10): 1967, 1968,1984, 1985, 1991, 1994, 2001, 2009, 2013, 2017
Runner's Up: 1987, 1997, 2000, 2003
CECAFA Club Cup: 5
 Champions (5): 1979, 1982, 1983, 1984, 1997.
Runner's Up: 1974, 1980, 1985
CECAFA Nile Basin Cup
Runner's Up: 2014

Performance in CAF competitions

African Cup of Champions Clubs/CAF Champions League
First round exits: 1971, 1972, 1981, 1982, 1983, 1987, 1993, 1999
Second round exits: 1989
Quarter-finals: 1974, 1990
Semi-final: 1968

CAF Confederation Cup
Preliminary round exits: 2010

CAF Cup
Quarter-finals: 1994, 1997

African Cup Winners' Cup
First round exits: 1992, 1992, 2002
Second round exits: 1986
Quarter-final exits: 1988
Semi-final exits: 1985

Players

Current squad

Out On Loan

Footballing and medical staff

Board of directors

Coaches and managers

 Interim Manager

See also
 A.F.C. Leopards–Gor Mahia rivalry

References

Sources
 The Standard, 23 July 2006:Once proud ‘Ingwe’ bite relegation bullet
 Kenya Premier League,8 February 2009 :Over-flowing crowds finally a 'crisis'? Hope Centre ground fails to cope

External links

 

Kenyan Premier League clubs
Football clubs in Kenya
Association football clubs established in 1964
Sport in Nairobi
1964 establishments in Kenya